The gateway belief model (GBM) is a dual process theory in psychology and the communication sciences. The model suggests that public perception of the degree of normative (expert) agreement – or (scientific) consensus – on societal issues, such as climate change, vaccines, evolution, gun control, and GMO's functions as a so-called "gateway" cognition, influencing an individual's personal opinions, judgments, attitudes, and affective dispositions toward various social and scientific issues.

History

Theoretical background
Specifically, the GBM postulates a two-step process of opinion change, where (mis)perceptions of normative agreement influence "key" personal beliefs that people hold about an issue (step 1), which in turn, shape public attitudes and support (step 2). Although the basic process of debiasing judgment can be viewed as a form of knowledge deficit, development of the gateway belief model is based on research in cognitive and social psychology, mainly drawing on theories of heuristic information-processing, social norms, decision-making, and motivated cognition.

Consensus-heuristic
In the face of uncertainty, people often look to others for guidance, including experts. Prior research shows that people heuristically rely on consensus cues in the absence of motivation to cognitively elaborate, because consensus typically implies correctness. Research also indicates that people desire to conform to the expert consensus and generally prefer to rely on the combined judgment of multiple experts rather than on individual expert opinions. Relying on consensus cues is often considered socially adaptive because it harnesses the wisdom of the crowd effect. Consensus is therefore an example of a descriptive norm, i.e., the collective judgment of a group of individuals, such as experts. Public opinion research shows that the views of the general public often diverge sharply from experts on a number of important societal issues, especially in the United States. This is known as the "consensus gap". The main premise of the gateway belief model is that this gap can be reduced by highlighting or communicating the actual degree of social or scientific consensus on an issue.

Norm perception as a vehicle for social change
The basic mechanism of the gateway belief model, i.e., aligning people's (mis)perception of the degree of group consensus with the factual degree of consensus parallels research in social psychology on leveraging norm-perception as a vehicle for social change. For example, early research showed that college students frequently misperceive the social consensus on campus binge drinking. Through a method known as "estimate and reveal", social psychologists have attempted to reveal the discrepancy between students' subjective perceptions of the drinking norm among their peers and the actual norm (which is typically much lower). Social norm communication campaigns indeed evidence that increasing awareness of the actual drinking norm has positive subsequent impacts on students' own attitudes and behavior towards binge drinking. While excessive binge drinking is often harmful to the individual, large-scale societal misperceptions of scientific agreement on social dilemmas such as climate change or vaccines can be collectively harmful. When the consensus intervention involves experts rather than peers, the social influence process is referred to as obedience.

Role of misinformation
The "sticky" nature of myths and the spread of misinformation is often cited as a major cause of public confusion over the nature of scientific consensus. Prominent examples include autism-vaccine controversies, the causal link between smoking and lung cancer and the role of carbon dioxide emissions in driving global warming. So-called vested-interest groups, also known as merchants of doubt, deliberately try to undermine public understanding of the scientific consensus on these topics through organized disinformation campaigns. People's perception of expert consensus has generally shown to be sensitive to anecdotal evidence and misinformation.

Related concepts
Other related concepts include the false-consensus effect and pluralistic ignorance.

Limitations
The "cultural cognition of scientific consensus" thesis advocated by Dan Kahan stands in contrast to the gateway belief model (GBM). The cultural cognition thesis suggests that people will credit or dismiss empirical evidence based on whether it coheres or conflicts with their cultural or political values, a process known as "identity-protective cognition". Because people are committed to the types of beliefs that define their everyday socio-political relations, the cultural cognition thesis predicts that exposing people to consensus information on contested issues will therefore increase attitude polarization. The empirical results of the gateway belief model contradict this prediction. Notably, highlighting scientific consensus has shown not to backfire and can even reduce or neutralize belief polarization between (political) groups. Related research has also shown that conveying scientific agreement can reduce directional motivated reasoning, although other research on this topic has revealed more mixed results. One explanation for these findings is that changing beliefs about what other groups think (so-called "meta-beliefs") does not require a full and immediate adjustment of one's own worldview. Perceived consensus can therefore be seen as a "non-identity threatening" cognition, especially when a norm is described among a neutral out-group (scientists).  Kahan has a notable on-going scholarly debate in the literature with van der Linden and Lewandowsky on the role of perceived consensus and cultural cognition.

References

Climate change and society
Cognitive science
Communication
Social influence
Political science
Psychological theories
Public health education